Belmont is an outer suburb in the City of Brisbane, Queensland, Australia.

Geography
While much of the suburb remains as undeveloped blocks of bush mixed with large rural properties, some areas have built-up residential estates.

Two of Brisbane's main roads, the Gateway Motorway above and Old Cleveland Road underneath, cross at a large intersection in Belmont. Belmont has become an affluent suburb with large estates sitting on acres of land.

History 
The local indigenous people hunted and camped within the creeks and hills of Belmont, both before and after white settlement of the area. A corroboree ground existed on banks of Bulimba Creek and mineral springs near Mount Petrie were a popular camping spot for the Aboriginal people.

Andrew Petrie had reported that fine timber existed in the area. Mount Petrie is named after him.

The suburb takes its name from Belmont House, built circa 1860 by Colonel August Bernecker. The name is derived from the French Bellemont meaning beautiful mountain.

The Hoop Pine brought timber cutters to the area in the 1850s and by the 1860s and 1870s the cleared land near the creeks and the rich soils from the cleared forests were used to grow sugar cane. As sugar production declined in southern Queensland, farmers moved to growing pineapples, bananas and small crops including tomatoes, potatoes and grapes. Dairies and fodder farms were also located in the area.

August Charles Frederick Bernecker gave the name Belmont to his new estate outside of Brisbane and this name spread to the rest of the area.

Belmont State School opened on 5 June 1876. It is now within the suburb boundaries of Carindale.

The Grassdale Land Company Limited formed on 8 January 1885 to acquire the property known as Grassdale Paddocks, in the parish of Tingalpa, with registered shareholders holding 80 shares of 250 pounds each. This area is spread across the Brisbane suburbs of Belmont, Chandler and Gumdale. The company offered the land for auction in the Grassdale Estate later in 1885. The allotments were situated along Grassdale Road, London Road, Boston Road, Old Cleveland Road, Archer Street and four unnamed roads (later called Belmont Road, Stanborough Road, Tilley Road and New Cleveland Road). Prior to the sale extensive publicity was published in the Brisbane newspapers, calling for "the attention of the investor, capitalist, farmer, merchant, artizan [sic], and mechanic, and is only one hour’s drive from Brisbane, and as it has been decided to run the Cleveland Railway through the Estate, it will be brought within a few minutes' ride of the heart of the city". The results of the public auction on 28 November 1885 were reported in the Telegraph newspaper with "forty-two lots were disposed of, comprising an area of 144 acres..." The Grassdale Land Company Limited later produced a plan of divisions of unsold land into 45 lots, listing the size and value of the lots at the time.

The local government area Belmont Division was split from the Bulimba Division in 1894 and by 1901 this became the Belmont Shire. Belmont Shire was a larger area than Belmont today with parts now included in the suburb of Carindale and other suburbs.

From 25 May 1912, the Belmont Shire Council operated the Belmont Tramway, a 3-foot 6 inches (1,067 mm) gauge steam tramway from Norman Park railway station to a terminus near the present State School. The line closed following the amalgamation of Shire into the City of Greater Brisbane in 1925.

The population was 50.5% female and 49.5% male. The median age of the Belmont population was 38 years of age.  72.6% of people living in Belmont were born in Australia, compared to the national average of 66.7%; the next most common countries of birth were New Zealand 5.2%, England 2.9%, China 1.7%, South Africa 1.3%, India 1.2%.  79.7% of people spoke only English at home; the next most popular languages were 2.3% Mandarin, 1.7% Greek, 1.4% Spanish, 1.2% Cantonese, 1.1% Italian.

Education
There are no schools within Belmont. Despite the name, Belmont State School is now within the current boundaries of Carindale.

The nearest government primary schools are Tingalpa State School in neighbouring Tingalpa to the north, Gumdale State School in neighbouring Gumdale to the north-east and Belmont State School in neighbouring Carindale to the west. The nearest government secondary schools are Brisbane Bayside State College in Wynnum West to the north-east, Whites Hill State College in Camp Hill to the west, and Mansfield State High School in Mansfield to the south-west.

Amenities
The Belmont Rifle Range hosts a number of sport shooting clubs. It was the venue for shooting events for the 1982 Commonwealth Games and will host again the same events in 2018 Commonwealth Games, and site of the 2011 World Long Range Championships. To the south of the rifle range is Mount Petrie.

Parks 
There are a number of parks in the suburb, including:

 Belmont Hills Bushland
 Cassandra Crescent Park
 Coventry Circuit Park
 Dairy Swamp Road Park
 Glenavon Street Park
 Iona Close Park
 Kianawah Park
 Meadowlands Picnic Ground Park
 Mt Petrie Road Park (no.386)
 Pinnacle Place Park
 She-oak Park
 Summit Street Park
 Thredbo Place Park
 Tilley Road (no 727) Park
 Wright Street Park

See also
 List of tramways in Queensland

References

External links

 University of Queensland: Queensland Places: Belmont and Belmont Shire

Suburbs of the City of Brisbane
1894 establishments in Australia
Populated places established in 1894